The Prix collégial du cinéma québécois is an annual Canadian film award, presented to a film from Quebec judged as the best of the year by a jury of students in film studies programs at the province's CEGEPs. The award is presented in conjunction with Québec Cinéma, and headed by filmmaker Micheline Lanctôt.

The award was presented for the first time in 2012, honouring films released in 2011.

The initial slate of shortlisted nominees for the award is selected by a provincewide committee and announced in January, following which the participating schools integrate the films into their programs so that students can view, discuss and debate them. During the Rendez-vous Québec Cinéma festival in February, events are also organized with each of the nominated directors, allowing participating students to meet the filmmakers and ask questions about the films. Finally, in late March the award conference is organized, in which students from across the province gather to engage in the final discussions and deliberations to select the award winner. 

From its inauguration until 2023, the organization presented only a single award each year for feature films. In 2021, in addition to the regular award for that year's films, the organization marked its tenth anniversary by presenting a Film of the Decade award to one of the ten films that had won the annual award up to that point, which was won by Xavier Dolan's Laurence Anyways.

In 2023, an award for short films was introduced.

Feature films

2010s

2020s

Short films

References

External links

Canadian film awards
Quebec awards